Joshua Abrams may refer to:

Joshua Abrams (gridiron football) (born 1986), American football player
Joshua Abrams (musician), American jazz bassist and composer

See also
Josh Abrahams (born 1968), Australian musician